The Brisson river is a tributary of the rivière aux Anglais flowing in the unorganized territory of Rivière-aux-Outardes, in the Manicouagan Regional County Municipality, in the administrative region of Côte-Nord, in the province of Quebec, in Canada.

The Brisson river valley is mainly served by the English river path.

The surface of the English River is generally frozen from the beginning of December to the end of March, except the rapids areas; however, safe circulation on the ice is generally from mid-December to mid-March.

Geography 
The Brisson River rises on the Canadian Shield, at Lake Louis. This forest lake is surrounded by mountains.

  north-west across Lake Philippe, to its mouth;
  north-west crossing lac Brisson, to its mouth;
  first towards the north by crossing a small lake, then towards the south-east by crossing Lake Thérèse which is located in a deep valley and collects the Gagnon stream (coming from the northwest), to its mouth;
  towards the south-east in a deep valley, crossing three small lakes, until the dam located at a discharge (coming from the north-west) of three lakes;
  towards the south-east in a deep valley which opens onto a forest plain at the end of the segment, until its mouth which pours out on the west bank of the Baie des Anglais, on the north shore of the estuary of Saint Lawrence.

The Brisson river flows on the north bank of the intermediate course of the English river, in the unorganized territory of Rivière-aux-Outardes.

Toponym 
The term "Brisson" is a family name of French origin.

The toponym "Brisson river" was formalized on August 2, 1974, at the Place Names Bank of the Commission de toponymie du Québec.

See also 

 List of rivers of Quebec

References

Further reading 
 .

Rivers of Côte-Nord
Manicouagan Regional County Municipality